Muhammad Firhan Ashari (born 9 March 1993) is a Malaysian field hockey player. He competed at the 2010 and 2010 Asian Games.

Firhan, in his debut season in the Malaysia Hockey League (MHL), scored six goals for Tenaga Nasional and his performance in the MHL earned him a national senior call-up. He made his international senior team debut in the 2011 Sultan Azlan Shah Cup in Ipoh.

He was part of Malaysia's Champions Trophy squad in 2011 where he scored a goal seven seconds from time to help Malaysia win the bronze medal in the inaugural AHF Champions Trophy in Ordos City, China.

References

External links

1993 births
Living people
Malaysian people of Malay descent
People from Terengganu
Malaysian male field hockey players
Male field hockey forwards
Field hockey players at the 2014 Asian Games
2014 Men's Hockey World Cup players
Field hockey players at the 2018 Asian Games
2018 Men's Hockey World Cup players
Medalists at the 2018 Asian Games
Asian Games silver medalists for Malaysia
Asian Games medalists in field hockey
2023 Men's FIH Hockey World Cup players